Shigeru Itō (伊藤茂; 1928–2016) was a Japanese socialist politician. He held several positions in the Japan Socialist Party (JSP) and then in the Social Democratic Party. He also served as the minister of transportation between 1993 and 1994.

Biography
Itō graduated from the University of Tokyo receiving a bachelor's degree in economics. He worked as a junior staff at the headquarters of the JSP in Tokyo in the 1960s. He was elected as one of the secretaries to the national congress for the restoration of the Japan-China diplomatic relations which was established by the JSP in 1970. He became a member of the House of Representatives in 1976 from the JSP and served there for eight terms until 2000.

In early 1980s Itō and two other socialist politicians were accused by a former Soviet spy of intentionally or unintentionally helping the Soviet security agency, KGB. As of 1989 Itō was the chairman of the JSP's policy board.

In August 1993 Itō was appointed minister of transport to the cabinet led by Prime Minister Morihiro Hosokawa. He remained in the post until April 1994. When the JSP was dissolved in 1996 Itō joined the Social Democratic Party and served as its secretary general.

Itō died in September 2016.

References

External links

20th-century Japanese politicians
1928 births
2016 deaths
Ministers of Transport of Japan
Social Democratic Party (Japan) politicians
University of Tokyo alumni
Japanese economists
Members of the House of Representatives (Japan)